Chris Hutchinson (born August 2, 1972) is a Canadian poet, novelist and educator.

Books 
Unfamiliar Weather (Muses' Company, 2005)
Other People's Lives (Brick Books, 2009)
A Brief History of the Short-lived (Nightwood Editions, 2012)
Jonas in Frames: an Epic (Goose Lane Editions / icehouse poetry, 2014)
In the Vicinity of Riches (Goose Lane Editions / icehouse poetry, 2020)

References

External links 
 Chris Hutchinson
 BC BookWorld

21st-century Canadian poets
Canadian male short story writers
Writers from Vancouver
Living people
1972 births
Canadian male poets
21st-century Canadian short story writers
21st-century Canadian male writers